Pestalotiopsis longiseta is a fungal plant pathogen infecting tea.

References

External links
 Index Fungorum
 USDA ARS Fungal Database

Fungal plant pathogens and diseases
Tea diseases
longiseta
Taxa named by John Baptiste Henri Joseph Desmazières